The Peacock Fan is a 1929 American silent mystery film directed by Phil Rosen and starring Lucien Prival, Dorothy Dwan and Tom O'Brien. A review in Variety described it as a "fairly interesting melodrama of the who-killed-Reginald-Moneybags school".

Synopsis
In China a peacock fan causes a jealous husband to murder his wife. Many years later in the United States, a wealthy collector who now owns the fan is found murdered. Doctor Chang Dorfman takes over the investigation and assembles the twelve likely suspects together.

Cast

References

Bibliography
 Michael R. Pitts. Poverty Row Studios, 1929-1940: An Illustrated History of 55 Independent Film Companies, with a Filmography for Each. McFarland & Company, 2005.

External links

1929 films
1929 mystery films
American mystery films
Films directed by Phil Rosen
American silent feature films
Chesterfield Pictures films
American black-and-white films
Films set in China
1920s English-language films
1920s American films
Silent mystery films